Ignaz Rudolf Schiner (April 17, 1813 – July 6, 1873) was an Austrian entomologist who specialised in Diptera.

He was a ministerial secretary in Vienna

His most significant publications are:
 Fauna Austriaca. Die Fliegen (Diptera). Nach der analytischen Methode bearbeitet 1862–1864.
As editor  Catalogus systematicus dipterorum Europae. W.M.W. Impensis: Societatis Zoologico-Botanicae 1864.
Schiner's collections are in the Naturhistorisches Museum in Vienna.

References
Frauenfeld, von 1873 [Schiner, I. R.]  Verh. k.-k. zool.-bot. Ges. Wien, Sitzungsber., Wien 23: 465-468.
Musgrave, A. 1932 Bibliography of Australian Entomology 1775–1930. Sydney, 280
Osten-Sacken, C. R. 1903  Record of my life and work in entomology. Cambridge, MA, 158–164.

External links
 Digital version of Fauna Austriaca. Die Fliegen (Diptera). Nach der analytischen Methode bearb., mit der Characteristik sämmtlicher europäischer Gattungen, der Beschreibung aller in Deutschland vorkommenden Arten und der Aufzählung aller bisher beschriebenen Arten. Von J. Rudolph Schiner.  I. Theil. Wien. C. Gerolds Sohn,1862–64.
 Gaedike, R.; Groll, E. K. & Taeger, A. 2012: Bibliography of the entomological literature from the beginning until 1863 : online database - version 1.0 - Senckenberg Deutsches Entomologisches Institut.
 

1813 births
1873 deaths
Austrian entomologists
Dipterists